Echo Bay Marine Provincial Park is a provincial park in British Columbia, Canada, established in 1971 and containing . It is located at the bay of the same name, offshore from the community of the same name, which is the location of the Simoom Sound post office and is on the west side of Gilford Island.

References

Provincial parks of British Columbia
Central Coast of British Columbia
1971 establishments in British Columbia
Protected areas established in 1971
Marine parks of Canada